Ingrid Natasha Visser (born 20 February 1966) is a New Zealand marine biologist who studies orcas. She regularly lectures on the subject aboard cruise ships, especially in Antarctica, and has been featured in several documentaries about orcas.

Early life 
Visser was born in Lower Hutt, Wellington, New Zealand. Her parents were Dutch immigrants who moved to New Zealand in the 1950s.  They were both nationalised as New Zealanders after she was born.

Between June 1982 and November 1986, Visser sailed with her parents and sister aboard a  yacht around the world.

Education 
Visser holds three university degrees: a Bachelor of Science (Massey University), a Masters of Science, and a Doctorate of Philosophy (both the University of Auckland).  Visser has been working with orca (Orcinus orca, also known as killer whales) since 1992 and completed her PhD in 2000, the first scientific study of orca in New Zealand waters.

Scientific work 

Her research on orca has been published in international scientific journals, since 1998, and many of these publications are available on the Orca Research Trust website.

In 2002 Visser’s research was instrumental in the New Zealand Government’s reclassification of New Zealand orcas from “Common” in the New Zealand Threat Classification System to “Nationally Critical”.  This is the equivalent status of “Critically Endangered” in the internationally recognised IUCN Red Data listing.

Publications 
She has published numerous popular articles and her photographs have appeared in magazines such as National Geographic, BBC Wildlife, New Zealand Geographic, and An Encyclopedia of New Zealand.

Visser has set up the Orca Research Trust, the Antarctic Killer Whale Identification Catalogue and was a co-founder of the Punta Norte Orca Research non-profit organisations all focusing on orca research.  She also set up Adopt an Orca to facilitate fund raising and public awareness.

Visser has written an autobiography, Swimming with Orca, which was a finalist in the Environmental category of the New Zealand Montana Book Awards, and two children’s books (I Love Killer Whales and The Orca).  The latter has been translated into Māori and is currently in press as a bilingual English/Spanish publication.

Visser works as a guide on a variety of eco-tourism adventures, from swimming with whales to visiting Antarctica.  She is also a public speaker.

Other work 
Visser is a member of the Australia & New Zealand branch of The Explorers Club and continues to travel the world in search of orca.  She published the first manuscript on Papua New Guinea orca, and returns regularly to Walindi Plantation Resort to conduct field research there.

She serves as Chair of the Free Morgan Foundation, and organization involved in efforts to free captive orca Morgan in Europe, and has appeared in court in relation to those efforts.

In September 2010, she co-founded Whale Rescue, an organisation of volunteers who provide logistical and practical expertise and equipment for rescuing cetaceans.

In June 2017, she served as a witness to a Senate committee on Fisheries and Oceans in the Senate of Canada in favour of Bill S-203, which would make it illegal to keep cetaceans and whales in captivity in Canada.

Documentaries 
Visser has appeared in and contributed to documentaries featuring her research with orcas. IMDb lists some of her work:

 Discovery Channel’s “The Orca: Killers I have Known”  (1997)
 Animal Planet’s “Untamed & Uncut: Killer Whales Attack a Seal”
 PBS and Jean-Michel Cousteau’s award-winning “Call of the Killer Whale” (2009)
 BBC Two’s “The Woman Who Swims With Killer Whales” (2011-2012)
 Robert Marc Lehmann "0800 See Orca" (2022)

References

External links
 
 New Zealander of the Year finalist: Dr Ingrid Visser, The New Zealand Herald
 Orca Research Trust

1966 births
Living people
Massey University alumni
New Zealand biologists
University of Auckland alumni
Orca researchers
Articles containing video clips
People from Lower Hutt
New Zealand people of Dutch descent
New Zealand marine biologists
Women marine biologists